This is a list of notable people who were born in, residents of, or otherwise closely associated with the American city of Midland, Texas.

Armed forces
 Tommy Franks, retired General, United States Army
 George H. O'Brien Jr., Medal of Honor recipient

Arts

Film, television, and theater
 Michael Arden, actor
 Kathy Baker, actress
 Jeannette Charles, actress
 Ed Graczyk, playwright
 Woody Harrelson, actor
 Tommy Lee Jones, actor
 Bessie Love, actress
 Carolyn McCormick, actress
 Douglas McGrath, film writer and director
 Jackson Rathbone, actor and musician

Journalism and literature

 Raymond Benson, author of post-Ian Fleming James Bond novels
 Marilyn Buck, poet, translator, revolutionary, and political prisoner
 Tracy Daugherty, author and biographer
 John R. Erickson, author of the Hank the Cowdog book series
 Doyle Glass, historian and sculptor
 Stephen Graham Jones, writer
 Larry L. King, author
 Cathy Luchetti, writer
 Larry D. Thomas, 2008 Texas State Poet Laureate
 Eileen Wilks, romance and urban fantasy author

Music
 Kirk Covington, drummer with Tribal Tech
 Explosions in the Sky, three of the four members of indie rock group hail from Midland (Mark Smith - guitar, synthesizer; Michael James -guitar, bass, keyboards; and Munaf Rayani – guitar, keyboards, percussion)
 Susan Graham, mezzo-soprano
 Happy-Tom (Thomas Seltzer), bassist (originally drummer) and main songwriter in the band Turbonegro

Athletes
 Cedric Benson, NFL player
 Mookie Blaylock, NBA player
 Hal Dean, NFL player
 Antwan Goodley Jr., NFL player
 Jim Hall, race car designer, owner, driver
 Bobby Hillin, NASCAR driver
 Natalie Hinds, Olympic swimmer
 E. J. Holub, NFL player
 KC Jones, NBA player
 Wahoo McDaniel, AFL player and wrestler
 Jayson Nix, MLB player
 Laynce Nix, MLB player
 Max Muncy, MLB player
 Judy Rankin, LPGA all-time money winner
 Doug Russell, 1968 Olympic gold medalist
 Carson Smith, MLB player
 Mike Stanton, MLB player
 Mike Timlin, MLB player
 Rex Tucker, NFL player
 Ryan Tucker, NFL player
 Randy Velarde, MLB player
 Spud Webb, NBA player
 Eric Winston, NFL player
 Tyler Young Nascar driver 
 James Zachery, CFL player

Business

 Frederic C. Hamilton, businessman, philanthropist
 J. Hugh Liedtke, founder of Pennzoil
 Clarence Scharbauer (1879–1942), rancher, president of the First National Bank of Midland and the Midland Fair

Government and politics

 Ernest Angelo, Mayor of Midland, 1972–1980; Republican national committeeman, 1976–1996
 Barbara Bush, former First Lady of the United States
 Barbara Pierce Bush, daughter of former President George W. Bush
 George H. W. Bush, 41st President of the United States
 George W. Bush, 43rd President of the United States
 Jeb Bush, former Governor of Florida
 Jenna Bush Hager, daughter of former President George W. Bush
 Laura Bush, former First Lady of the United States
 Frank Kell Cahoon, Midland oilman; the only Republican in the Texas legislature, 1965–1966; former Midland City Council member
 Mike Conaway, United States Congressman
 Tom Craddick, District 82 State Representative and former Speaker of the Texas House
 Donald Evans, former US Secretary of Commerce
 Deborah Fikes, executive advisor and representative to United Nations for World Evangelical Alliance
 Kenn George, former state representative from Dallas County and unsuccessful candidate for Texas land commissioner
 David J. Porter, Republican, Texas Railroad Commission member, 2010–2016
 Carol Schwartz, former member of the D.C. city council, raised in Midland
 W. E. "Pete" Snelson, member of both houses of the Texas State Legislature from Midland; later an educational consultant in Austin
 Clayton Williams, businessman and 1990 gubernatorial candidate
 Michael L. Williams, Texas Railroad Commission member

Science and technology
 Leeon D. Davis, plane designer and builder
 Jim Hall, race car designer and builder using aerodynamics ground effect to produce winning race cars

Other
 Bob Fu, pastor
 Jessica McClure, "Baby Jessica"
 Kathleen Zellner, attorney

References

Midland, Texas
 
Midland